Kirkton of Tough, usually shortened to Tough, is a settlement in the Marr area of Aberdeenshire, Scotland at . Tough is where the Aberdeen Angus breed of cattle was first bred.

The church (kirk of Kirkton) was dedicated to the Nine Maidens and dates from at least 1366 but was rebuilt in 1838.

References

See also

 Aberdeenshire (historic)

Villages in Aberdeenshire